This is a list of works by Scottish composer Erik Chisholm (1904–1965).

Ballets 
 The Forsaken Mermaid, 1936
 The Pied Piper of Hamelin, 1937
 The Earth Shapers, 1941
 The Hoodie Craw, 1948
 The Piobaireachd
 A Woodland Tale
 Polish Woman

Operas 
 The Feast of Samhain, 1941
 The Inland Woman, 1951 (based on Mary Lavin's 'The Green Death and the Black Death')
 Dark Sonnet, 1952 (based on the play 'Before Breakfast' by Eugene O'Neill)
 Black roses, 1954
 Simoon, 1953 (based on a text by August Strindberg)
 Unnatural Death, 1953
 The Midnight Court, 1954-61 (based on 'A Rhythmical Bacchanalia' by Bryon Merryman)
 The Canterbury Tales, 1961-62 (based on Chaucer's 'Canterbury Tales')
 The Caucasian Chalk Circle, 1963 (based on Berthold Brecht's 'The Caucasian Chalk Circle')
 The Importance of Being Earnest, 1963 (based on Oscar Wilde's play of The Importance of Being Earnest)
 The Life and Loves of Robert Burns, 1963 (based on poems of Burns, and his correspondence with brother Gilbert and other contemporaries)
 The Wolflings

Dark Sonnet, Black roses and Simoon formed the three-act trilogy of Murder in Three Keys.

Orchestral

Symphonies
 Symphony No. 1 in C minor
 Symphony No. 2, 1939

Other orchestral works
 Adventures of Babar
 A Celtic Wonder Tale
 Ceol Mor Dances : Version for Orchestra
 Chaconne, 1922
 Dunedin Suite, for strings
 The Enchanted Forest: Prelude for Orchestra
 The Freiris of Berwick
 From The True Edge Of The Great World: Preludes for Orchestra
 From The Western Isles, 1939, for strings
 Hebridia: Orchestral Suite Part 1
 March
 Pictures From Dante, 1948
 Prelude in G
 Rhapsody
 Six Celestial Pieces : No 1 - Sirius
 Straloch Suite, 1933
 Straloch Suite for Strings
 Sword Dance
 Two Pieces for String Orchestra, 1929
 A Woodland Tale

Concertante
 Dance Suite, for piano and orchestra, 1932
 Piano Concerto No.1 Piobaireachd, 1937
 Piano Concerto No.2  On Hindustani Themes, 1948–1949
 Cantos Gitanos, for piano and orchestra
 Concerto for Violin and Orchestra, 1950

Chamber

One player
 Sonata for Cello Alone, 1930
 Sonata for Solo Viola
 Sonata for Solo Violin, 1930

Two players
 Gavotte, for violin and piano, 1934
 Morris Dance, for violin and piano
 A Scotch Tit-Bit, for violin and piano
 Sonata for 2 Violoncellos
 Three Miniatures, for cello and piano
 Three Short Pieces for Clarinet and Piano, 1960

Four players
 A Highland Stream, quartet for flute, clarinet, cello and triangle
 Sorrow for a Queen (after Maeterlink) : Version for Brass Quartet
 Three Pieces for String Quartet : No 1 - Idyll
 Three Pieces for String Quartet
 Three Scottish Lullabies, string quartet

Five players
 Ceol Mor Dances, quintet for four pianos and percussion
 Sonatina for Woodwind Quintet
 Three Dances, quintet for flute, oboe, clarinet, horn and bassoon

Six or more players
 Double Trio, for clarinet, bassoon, trumpet, violin, cello and double bass
 Allegro, for clarinet, bassoon, trumpet, percussion, violin and cello
 Gipsy, for flute, oboe, clarinet, bassoon, horn, two violins, viola and cello
 Sarabande, for flute, oboe, clarinet, bassoon, horn and timpani

Piano

One piano
 Sonata in A: An Riobain Dearg (The Red Robin)
 The Piobroch Sonatina
 Sonatine Ecossaise
 Night Song of the Bards, six nocturnes for piano
 All Quiet on the Western Front, a sonata in three movements
 Honeycombs; for the Children, pianoforte suite
 Perthshire Airs
 Highland Sketches
 G minor Sonatina, 1922
 Sonatina No.4
 Elegies Nos. 1-4
 With Cloggs On
 Collection of Piano solos, Ceol Mor, which reflect Highland bagpipe tunes known as Piobaireachd
 Lord Lovat's Lament
 Maclean of Cole putting his Foot on the Neck of his Enemy
 Duntroon Pibroch
 Mackenzie of Applecross
 The Macgregors
 The Chisholm
 MacCrimmon's Lament
 Lament for King James
 Cluig Pheairt
 No. 16
 Too Long in this Condition
 A Lament for the Harp Tree
 Squinting Patrick's Flame of Wrath

Two pianos
 Piano Concerto No 2 : On Hindustani Themes : arranged for 2 Pianos

Vocal

Songs with orchestra
 Dismal is this Life for Me (tenor)
 The Minde's Melody (female chorus)
 Mungo (bass solo with chorus)
 O Son Of God It Is A Great Grief (tenor with piano)
 Pageant of Music for the People, 1939 (chorus)
 There Was a Time When I Thought Far Sweeter (tenor)
 Though You Like to Drink Your Ale (tenor)

Songs with piano
 The Bee
 Blossoms
 The Blue-Bird
 The Braw Plum (William Soutar)
 Celtic Folk Songs
 A Celtic Song Book
 The Chailleach (Patrick MacDonald) [baritone]
 Cradle-Croon (Yeats)
 Cradle Song (Version 2), 1926
 A Dirge for Summer (William Soutar)
 The Donkey, 1923 (G K Chesterton)
 The Fairies, 1923
 I Arose one morning early (Patrick MacDonald) [baritone]
 In The Dark
 Little Boney (1806) : The Sergeant's Song, 1926 [tenor]
 Meditation
 My Ocean Steed, 1923
 The Offending Eye, 1926 (A E Housman) [high voice]
 Ossian's Soliloquy (Patrick MacDonald) [baritone]
 Seven Poems of Love (Lillias Scott) [soprano]
 'Love's Reward'
 'Johnnie Logie'
 'Skreigh o' Day'
 'Fragment (Lament)'
 'Prayer'
 'Innocence'
 'Hert's Sang'
 She Calls Me Her Coal-Black Mammy
 Sixty Cubic Feet (Randall Swingler) [baritone]
 Skinny Minny
 Snail, Snail, Shoot Out Your Horn
 Summer Song (William Soutar)
 The Prodigy (William Soutar)
 There's a Guid Time Comin' Yet
 The Three Worthies (William Soutar)

Unaccompanied songs
 Crabbed Age & Youth, 1926
 Cradle Song (Version 1), 1928
 A Highland Dirge [female chorus]
 I Want to Talk to Thee
 In Glasgow Here, 1925
 The Song of the Women, 1928
 Three Revolutionary Songs : Musical Recitative [male chorus]

Arrangements
 Paderewski's Theme Varié for two pianos
 Alkan's Symphonie Op 39 no 4-7 for a string orchestra
 Alkan's Concerto for Piano arranged for solo piano and string orchestra

Chisholm, Erik